The Ukrainian Cup 1995–96 is the fifth annual edition of Ukraine's football knockout competition, known as the Ukrainian Cup.

The Cup started with the round of 32, but it also had couple of preliminaries. This season two legs rounds were discontinued and all rounds consisted of only one game. Also the extra tier was merged with the Second League. The competition kicked off on 1 August 1995 with 24 games. Five games were announced as a forfeit on 1 August, while one more on 1 October 1995.

The cup holder Shakhtar Donetsk was eliminated in away game against Nyva Vinnytsia on penalties in semifinals.

Team allocation 
One hundred ten teams entered the competition

Distribution

First qualifying round entrants 
 26 regional representatives
 34 Second League (Avanhard-Industria Rovenky, Avanhard Zhydachiv, Azovets Mariupol, Chaika Sevastopol, CSKA Kyiv, Dnistrovets Bilhorod-Dnistrovskyi, Druzhba Berdiansk, Dynamo-Flesh Odesa, Dynamo Sloviansk, Harai Zhovkva, Keramik Baranivka, Khimik Kalush, Khutrovyk Tysmenytsia, Kosmos Pavlohrad, Meliorator Kakhovka, Metalurh Novomoskovsk, Nyva Myronivka, Obolon Kyiv, Olimpia Yuzhnoukrainsk, Oskil Kupiansk, Portovyk Illichivsk, Prometei Dniprodzerzhynsk, Ros-Transimpeks Bila Tserkva, Shakhtar Stakhanov, Shakhtar-2 Donetsk, Skhid Slavutych, Skify Lviv, Sportinvest Kryivyi Rih, Systema-Boreks Borodianka, Temp-Advis-2 Shepetivka, Torpedo Melitopol, Vahonobudivnyk Kremenchuk, Viktor Zaporizhzhia, Vodnyk Kherson)

Second qualifying round entrants 
 30 winners of the previous round
 10 Second League (Avtomobilist Sumy, Desna Chernihiv, Dynamo Saky, Halychyna Drohobych, Hazovyk Komarne, Karpaty Mukacheve, Okean Kerch, Shakhtar Shakhtarsk, Shakhtar Sverdlovsk, Tytan Armiansk)
 22 First League in whole
 2 Top League (CSKA-Borysfen Kyiv, Zirka-NIBAS Kirovohrad)

Competition schedule

First qualifying round

Second qualifying round

Third qualifying round

First Elimination Round

Second Elimination Round

Quarterfinals 

|}

Semifinals 

|}

 Note: Volodymyr Tsytkin caught all three Shakhtar's penalty shots allowing Nyva to advance to the finals.

Final 

The final was held at the Republican Stadium on May 26, 1996, in Kyiv.

Top goalscorers

Attendances

Top attendances

See also 
 Ukrainian Premier League 1995-96

References

External links 
 Calendar of Matches—Schedule of the Ukrainian Cup. 
 Info on the final 

Ukrainian Cup seasons
Cup
Ukrainian Cup